The 2009 Parramatta Eels season was the 63rd in the club's history. They competed in the NRL's 2009 Telstra Premiership, just making the finals by finishing 8th (out of 16). The Eels then continued their winning streak into the play-offs, reaching the 2009 NRL grand final which they lost to the Melbourne Storm.

Summary
Under new coach Daniel Anderson, Parramatta had an indifferent start to the season which saw the release of star halfback Brett Finch. After 18 rounds and incredibly inconsistent form, the Parramatta Eels had won only five games and were sitting third-last and were in direct contention for the dreaded 2009 NRL Wooden Spoon. TAB SportsBet had the Eels as $151 outsiders to win the NRL Premiership.

Though beginning in Round 19, upset victories against the Melbourne Storm and the Canterbury-Bankstown Bulldogs set the platform for an unexpected 10 wins from the next 11 games, which propelled the Eels into the Top 8 and consequently, premiership contention. This unanticipated winning streak was directly attributed by many sporting experts including Rugby League legend Andrew Johns to the spectacular run of form of star fullback Jarryd Hayne. Winning the award for man-of-the-match in every game from Round 19–24, and again in the first week of the finals, Hayne was described as "the best player in any code of football in Australia" by premiership-winning coach Phil Gould. Following his astonishing string of 7-man-of-the-match performances, Hayne won the award for Dally M Fullback of the Year and was crowned the best and fairest player in the game, winning the Dally M Medal for 2009.

After a seven-game winning streak, the Eels succumbed to a heavy defeat to the minor premiers St. George Illawarra, however they returned to Kogarah in Week 1 of the 2009 NRL Finals Series and defeated the Dragons 25–12 featuring an impressive late game try by Dally M medal winner Jarryd Hayne. Following successive wins against the Gold Coast Titans (a team that Parramatta had never beaten before), 27–2 at SFS and Canterbury, 22–12 in front of a record-breaking non-Grand Final crowd of 74,549 at ANZ stadium, Parramatta qualified for their first Grand Final since 2001, becoming the first 8th-placed team to ever qualify for a Grand Final. On 4 October 2009, the Parramatta Eels played the deciding game of NRL, against the Melbourne Storm at ANZ Stadium in front of a crowd of 82,538. The Eels lost the match 23–16, ending what critics called "the Parramatta Fairytale".

On 22 April 2010, the Melbourne Storm were stripped of the premiership as a result of long-term gross salary cap breaches disclosed by the NRL. However, the premiership for 2009 was not handed over to the Parramatta Eels, instead remaining vacant.

Mid-season the Parramatta club had a change of CEO, Denis Fitzgerald was replaced by Paul Osborne. Fullback Jarryd Hayne was the only Eels player selected to play in the 2009 State of Origin series.

Standings

National Rugby League

National Youth Competition

Fixtures

Pre-season

Note: Match one was an unofficial trial match.

Home and away season

Finals series

Players and staff
The playing squad and coaching staff of the Parramatta Eels for the 2009 NRL season as of 18 September 2009.

Awards
The following awards were awarded in the post-season:
Michael Cronin clubman of the year award: Nathan Hindmarsh
Ken Thornett Medal (Players' player): Jarryd Hayne
Jack Gibson Award (Coach's award): Joel Reddy
Eric Grothe Rookie of the Year Award: Daniel Mortimer

References

Parramatta Eels seasons
Parramatta Eels season